The Torneo Regional Federal Amateur (in English "Regional Federal Amateur Tournament") is one of the two professional leagues that form the regionalised fourth level of the Argentine football league system, along with Primera C Metropolitana. The competition was established in 2018 as a result of a change in the structure of the league system, replacing Torneo Federal B.

Federal Amateur is organised by "Consejo Federal", a division of the Argentine Football Association. Clubs in Federal B have indirect membership in AFA unlike clubs in Primera C, which have direct membership. All teams with indirect membership are from outside the city of Buenos Aires (playing in regional leagues) and its metropolitan area (Greater Buenos Aires), while most of the direct members are from the aforementioned area.

List of champions

References

External links
 Sitio Oficial de AFA
 Ascenso del Interior
 Interior Futbolero
 Promiedos
 RSSSF

2018 establishments in Argentina
4
Association football leagues in South America
Professional sports leagues in Argentina
Sports leagues established in 2018
Argentina